John Wakefield is the name of:

 John Wakefield (banker) (1738–1811), English Quaker merchant and financier
 John Allen Wakefield (1797 - 1873), American historian, politician, soldier, physician, and lawyer
 John Wakefield (civil servant), ex director of Agriculture in Tanganyika
 John Wakefield (footballer), British footballer who competed at the Football at the 1960 Summer Olympics – Men's team squads
 John Wakefield, is a councillor and Mayor of Waverley Council

In fiction:

John Wakefield, the legendary perpetrator in the horror mystery miniseries Harper's Island